Gerasimos Vokos (1868–1927) was a Greek scholar, writer, painter, and journalist.

Descended from the Arvanite family Vokos family of Hydra, he was born in Patras in 1868 and died in Paris, France in 1928.

He began his career as a journalist, displaying particular talent as a chronicler and an article writer, at the most important Athenian newspapers of that time. He continued as an author, publishing several studies and monographs, as well as several books on various subjects. Among his most notable works are the 1893 novel Mr. President, the theatrical plays The Year '21 (referring to the Greek War of Independence) and The Megali Idea, both from 1901, the historical novel The Occupation, which was later adapted as a play, Greek Symphonies in 1916, his 1923 Short Stories, the 1923 novel The Exile, and others.

He also founded and managed two literary journals, Our Journal, published every fortnight in Piraeus in 1900, and Artist, published in Athens in 1910–12 and 1914. During the last years of his life he settled in Paris, where he experienced some success as a painter, despite being self-taught. The subjects of his work were drawn from Greek landscapes (particularly Mount Pelion) and Parisian life.

References 

 The first version of the article is translated and is based from the article at the Greek Wikipedia (el: Main Page)

1868 births
1927 deaths
Writers from Patras
Greek journalists
Artists from Patras
20th-century Greek painters
Greek emigrants to France
Arvanites
19th-century Greek painters